"Kali Yuga" is the third and final single of Echobelly's fourth album People Are Expensive. It reached 175 in the UK Singles Chart.

The 2 b-sides are re-recorded versions of the b-sides to Bellyache.

Track listing

Credits
Bass – James Harris
Drums – Andy Henderson 
Guitar – Glenn Johansson
Voice – Sonya Madan
Track 1 recorded by Ben Hillier
Track 2 recorded and mixed by James Laughry
Track 3 recorded by – Dick Meaney
Track 1 remixed by Charlie Francis & Nick Watts
Mastered By Chris Parmenidis

References

External links 
https://www.discogs.com/Echobelly-Kali-Yuga/release/2526855

2001 singles
Echobelly songs
2001 songs